Jerrell Quartez Powe (born March 15, 1987) is a former American football nose tackle. He was drafted by the Kansas City Chiefs in the sixth round of the 2011 NFL Draft. He played college football for Ole Miss.

High school career
Powe attended Wayne County High School in Waynesboro, Mississippi, where he had 71 tackles and 14 sacks as a junior. As a senior, he was credited with 89 tackles, including nine QB sacks, while forcing five fumbles. Powe subsequently earned All-American honors by Parade and USA Today.

Considered a five-star recruit by Rivals.com, Powe was listed as the No. 3 defensive tackle prospect in the nation, behind DeMarcus Granger and Callahan Bright. He chose Ole Miss over Auburn, LSU, and Texas A&M.

College career
Entering Ole Miss with a lot of hype, Powe was deemed a "potential freshman star" by some in the media. However, he had not completed the necessary 14 core courses in high school, and therefore was denied freshman eligibility. He spent a year at Hargrave Military Academy, a prep school in Virginia—where he was classmates with Vidal Hazelton, Keiland Williams, and fellow Ole Miss recruit John Jerry—, taking correspondence courses, but was again denied eligibility. The NCAA said at the time that Powe could either return to high school or go to a junior college.

Powe returned to Waynesboro to retake courses, attended Penn Foster Career School, a prep school in Scranton, Pennsylvania, and took correspondence courses in 2006. He returned to Ole Miss for the 2007 season, as the NCAA allowed him to practice for 14 days while it sorted out his status in August 2007, then again denied his quest to play for the Rebels. Powe attended Ole Miss in 2007–08 on financial aid but could not practice or participate.

Finally returning to the football field in 2008, Powe saw action in 12 games, missing only Arkansas, and earned his first letter. He totaled eight tackles with 3.5 tackles-for-a-loss and 1.5 quarterback sacks, while also recording an interception.

In 2009, Powe became a full-time starter for the Rebels and, according to Tony Pauline of Sports Illustrated, had NFL scouts "excited about his upside potential". He registered 34 tackles, including 12 TFLs, and 3 quarterback sacks. In his senior season, his numbers slightly dropped to 27 tackles (8.5 TFLs) and 2.5 sacks. He was awarded all-Conference Second-team honors after each year.

Professional career

2011 NFL Draft
Coming into his final season Powe was rated as the top nose tackle prospect and drew comparisons to B. J. Raji, but he had a somewhat disappointing season and watched his stock slip. Graded as a second to third round talent, Powe fell in the 2011 NFL Draft due to his relatively high age— on draft day. Powe was selected by the Kansas City Chiefs in the 6th round.

Kansas City Chiefs

In his rookie season, Powe was third on the depth chart at nose tackle, behind veteran Kelly Gregg and journeyman Amon Gordon. He made his NFL debut for the Chiefs in a loss against New England on November 21, 2011—his only game in 2011. In 2012, Powe competed with Anthony Toribio and rookie Dontari Poe to succeed the retiring Gregg at nose tackle, eventually losing out to Poe. Powe appeared only in nine games in 2012, seeing limited minutes as third-string back-up. The Chiefs waived him in the last round of final cuts on September 1, 2013. On December 3, 2013, Powe was signed by the Chiefs. On December 13, 2013, the Chiefs released Powe. Powe re-signed with the Chiefs on December 19, 2013.

Houston Texans
On March 18, 2014, Powe signed with the Houston Texans.

Washington Redskins
On June 1, 2015, Powe signed with the Washington Redskins. On September 5, Powe was released for final roster cuts before the start of the regular season.

Powe signed a futures contract with the team on January 4, 2016. The team released him on September 3, 2016.

Legal troubles
On January 17, 2023, Powe was arrested and charged for kidnapping.

References

External links

Houston Texans bio
Kansas City Chiefs bio
Ole Miss Rebels bio

1987 births
Living people
People from Wayne County, Mississippi
Players of American football from Mississippi
American football defensive tackles
Ole Miss Rebels football players
Kansas City Chiefs players
Houston Texans players
Washington Redskins players